Siemon William Muller (May 9, 1900 – September 9, 1970) was an American paleontologist and geologist, known for his studies on Triassic paleontology and stratigraphy, and for his work on permafrost.

Siemon Muller was born in Blagoveshchensk on May 9, 1900 (Muller's father Wilhelm had moved from Denmark to Russia to work on the trans-Siberian telegraph line and later became a teacher). Siemon attended the Russian Naval Academy until the Russian Revolution overtook the nation, when he moved to Shanghai to work with an American company. He sailed to the United States in 1921, and enrolled at the University of Oregon, where he studied geology. He graduated in 1927, and married Vera Vilamovsky the next year. Muller earned his master's degree from Stanford University in 1929, and his doctorate in 1930, studying Mesozoic ammonite fauna in the Pilot Mountains of Nevada under the direction of James Perrin Smith. Muller began teaching as an instructor at Stanford while still a graduate student. He was named an assistant professor in 1930, was promoted to associate professor in 1936 (the year of his election as fellow of the Geological Society of America), and became full professor in 1941.

In 1928, Muller made an initial identification of the ichthyosaur fossils found near Berlin, Nevada, although full excavations were not done until much later. Before and after World War II, Muller worked extensively with Henry G. Ferguson doing geological mapping in west-central Nevada (along with Ralph Roberts and Stanley H. Cathcart); this resulted in the publication of seven USGS geology quadrangle maps between 1951 and 1954. During World War II, Muller worked for the USGS Military Geology Unit, where he studied frozen terrains such as Alaska; his Russian language skills enabled him to read the extensive Russian scientific literature on the subject. Muller is generally credited with coining the work "permafrost".

In 1976, Muller Mountain in Mineral County, Nevada, was named after Siemon Muller to commemorate his work in the area. 

Upon Muller's retirement from Stanford in 1965, he was granted emeritus status. On September 9, 1970, he died quietly in his sleep at the Stanford campus.

Selected publications

References

Further reading
  = .

1900 births
1970 deaths
20th-century American geologists
American paleontologists
Emigrants from the Russian Empire to the United States
People from the Russian Empire of Danish descent
Stanford University alumni
University of Oregon alumni
Fellows of the Geological Society of America
Russian expatriates in China
People from Blagoveshchensk